The Circuit Paul Ricard is a French motorsport race track built in 1969 at Le Castellet, Var, near Marseille, with finance from pastis magnate Paul Ricard. Ricard wanted to experience the challenge of building a racetrack.

History

First years (1970–1990)

Opened on 19 April 1970, the circuit's innovative facilities made it one of the safest motor racing circuits in the world at the time of its opening. The circuit had three track layout permutations, a large industrial park and an airstrip. The combination of modern facilities, mild winter weather and an airstrip made it popular amongst racing teams for car testing during the annual winter off-season.

The long main straight and other fast sections made the track very hard on engines as they ran at full revs for extended spells. Engine failures were common, such as Ayrton Senna's huge crash during the 1985 French Grand Prix after the Renault engine in his Lotus failed and he went off backwards at Signes on his own oil and crashed heavily, with only light bruising to the driver. Nigel Mansell crashed at the same place in the same weekend during practice and suffered a concussion which kept him out of the race. The Honda powered FW10 holds the race lap record for the original circuit when Mansell's teammate Keke Rosberg recorded a time of 1:39.914 during the 1985 French Grand Prix. This compared to the slowest car in the race, the  naturally aspirated Tyrrell-Ford V8 of Stefan Bellof which could only manage . Bellof qualified 9 seconds slower than Surer and 12 seconds slower than pole winner Rosberg.

Paul Ricard was inaugurated with a 2-litre sports car race; during the 1970s and the 1980s the track developed some of the best French drivers of the time including four time World Drivers' Champion Alain Prost who won the French Grand Prix at the circuit in 1983, 1988, 1989 and 1990. The circuit hosted the Formula One French Grand Prix on many occasions, the first of which was the 1971 French Grand Prix.

The circuit was also extensively used for testing, especially in Formula One. In 1986, Brabham Formula One driver Elio de Angelis was killed in a testing accident at the fast first turn after the rear wing of his Brabham BT55 had broken off. Although the circuit was not the cause of the crash, it was modified in order to make it safer. Effectively, after the start, instead of heading into the left hand Verrerie sweeper, cars now braked hard and turned sharp right into a short run that connected the pit straight to the Mistral. This also had the effect of cutting lap times from Keke Rosberg's 1985 pole time of 1:32.462 in his Williams-Honda turbo, to Nigel Mansell's 1990 pole time of 1:04.402 in his V12 Ferrari.

From 1990 the French Grand Prix was moved to Magny-Cours where it ran until 2008. Paul Ricard hosted the French Grand Prix on 14 occasions between 1971 and 1990. The Long Circuit was used from 1971 to 1985, with the Club Circuit used from 1986 to 1990. On six occasions (1971, 1975, 1976, 1978, 1980 and 1989) the winner at Paul Ricard went on to win the World Championship in the same year. Ronnie Peterson (1973 and 1974) and René Arnoux (1982) are the only Ricard winners who never won the championship.

Recent times (1990–present)

In the 1990s the circuit's use was limited to motorcycle racing and French national racing, most notably until 1999, the Bol d'or 24-hour motorcycle endurance race. The track was also the home of the Oreca F3000 team. After Ricard's death, the track was sold to Excelis, a company owned by Formula One promoter Bernie Ecclestone, in 1999. The track was rebuilt into an advanced test track, and was for a time known as the Paul Ricard High Tech Test Track (Paul Ricard HTTT) before changing its name back to Circuit Paul Ricard.

An aircraft landing strip suitable for private jets is amongst the circuit's facilities. There is a Karting Test Track (KTT) that features the same type of abrasive safety zones as the car track. The track has also hosted some races, including the 2006 Paul Ricard 500km, a round of the FIA GT Championship. Other GT championships have run races here, most notably the Ferrari Challenge and races organized by Porsche clubs of France and Italy.

On 5 December 2016, it was announced that the French Grand Prix would return to the Formula 1 calendar for the 2018 season at Paul Ricard. It was the first French Grand Prix since 2008 (last held at Magny-Cours) and the first at Circuit Paul Ricard since 1990. On 19 June 2017, the FIA's World Motor Sport Council in Geneva published its 2018 provisional calendar with the French Grand Prix scheduled for 24 June at Circuit Paul Ricard with the race itself followed immediately by the Austrian Grand Prix at the Red Bull Ring and then the British Grand Prix at Silverstone Circuit. Pirelli Motorsport has planned for a two-day tyre testing for its 2018 Formula 1 tyres at Circuit Paul Ricard in the months of May, June and September 2017. The track remained on the F1 calendar until the 2022 season. It is, however, not part of the F1 schedule for 2023.

Paul Ricard has the 3-star FIA Environmental Accreditation. In a 2021 report, it was ranked the second most sustainable racetrack in the world, together with Circuit de Barcelona-Catalunya and behind Mugello Circuit.

Track

The track is also unusual in that it is built on a plateau: it is very flat. In 1986 the track was modified to shorten the circuit, by adding shortcut through to the middle of the Mistral Straight. Its flexibility and mild winter weather mean that it is used for testing by several motorsport teams, including Formula One teams.

The track is known for its distinctive black and blue run-off areas known as the Blue Zone. The runoff surface consists of a mixture of asphalt and tungsten, used instead of gravel traps, as common at other circuits. A second, deeper run-off area is the Red Zone, with a more abrasive surface designed to maximize tyre grip and hence minimize braking distance, although at the cost of extreme tyre wear. The final safeguard consists of Tecpro barriers, a modern improvement on tyre barriers.

In 2019 the pitlane entry was moved following safety concerns. The entry, which was previously accessed via the main straight, is now situated between the final two corners (turns 14 and 15).

Track configurations

Events

 Current

 March: Ultimate Cup Series UCS 5th Anniversary
 April: BOSS GP, Grand Prix de France Historique
 May: Porsche Sports Cup Suisse, Grand-Prix Camions du Castellet, 	
Sunday Rides Classic
 June: GT World Challenge Europe 1000 km Paul Ricard, GT4 European Series, Lamborghini Super Trofeo Europe, GT4 Scandinavia
 July: European Le Mans Series 4 Hours of Castellet, Le Mans Cup, F1 Academy, International GT Open, Formula Regional European Championship, Euroformula Open Championship, TCR Europe Series, Italian F4 Championship, Ligier European Series
 September: FIM Endurance World Championship Bol d'Or, Peter Auto Dix Mille Tours
 October: GT2 European Series SRO Racing Festival, Alpine Elf Europa Cup, FFSA GT Championship, French F4 Championship, Porsche Carrera Cup France, Championnat de France Superbike
 November: Ultimate Cup Series 6 Hours of Le Castellet

 Former

 24H Series (2015–2017, 2021)
 Auto GP (2014)
 BPR Global GT Series (1994–1996)
 British Formula 3 International Series (1978, 2011)
 European Touring Car Championship (1971–1973)
 European Touring Car Cup (2014–2016)
 F4 Spanish Championship (2019–2020)
 FIA European Formula 3 Championship (1977)
 FIA European Formula 3 Cup (1985)
 FIA Formula 2 Championship (2018–2019, 2022)
 FIA Formula 3 Championship (2019, 2021)
 FIA Formula 3 European Championship (2016)
 FIA GT Championship (2006, 2009)
 FIA GT1 World Championship (2010–2011)
 FIA Motorsport Games (2022)
 FIA Touring Car World Cup (1995)
 Formula 3 Euro Series (2010–2011)
 Formula 750 (1978)
 Formula One French Grand Prix (1971, 1973, 1975–1976, 1978, 1980, 1982–1983, 1985–1990, 2018–2019, 2021–2022)
 Formula Renault Eurocup (2011–2014, 2016–2020)
 Grand Prix motorcycle racing French motorcycle Grand Prix (1973, 1975, 1977, 1980–1981, 1984, 1986, 1988, 1991, 1996–1999)
 International Sports Racing Series (1998)
 Porsche Supercup (2022)
 Sidecar World Championship (1973, 1975, 1977, 1979–1981, 1984, 1986, 1988, 1991)
 Superbike World Championship (1989)
 World Series Formula V8 3.5 (2011–2014, 2016)
 World Sportscar Championship (1974)
 World Touring Car Championship FIA WTCC Race of France (2014–2016)
 W Series (2022)

Lap records 

The official lap record for the current F1 circuit layout (1C-V2) is 1:32.740, set by Sebastian Vettel during the 2019 French Grand Prix. While the unofficial all-time track record is 1:28.319, set by Lewis Hamilton during final qualifying for the aforementioned 2019 race. The fastest official race lap records at the Circuit Paul Ricard are listed as:

Notes

References

External links

  
 Map and circuit history at RacingCircuits.info
 Circuit Paul Ricard Guide

Formula One circuits
Grand Prix motorcycle circuits
Motorsport venues in France
French Grand Prix
Superbike World Championship circuits
Road test tracks
Sports venues in Var (department)
World Touring Car Championship circuits